{{Infobox tennis biography
| name            = Katrina M. Adams
| image= Katrina Adams.jpg
| country               = United States
| residence             = Yonkers, New York United States
| birth_date             = 
| birth_place            = Chicago, Illinois
| height     = 5'5| turnedpro             = 1988
| retired               = 1999
| plays                 = Right-handed (two-handed backhand)
| careerprizemoney      = $1,294,235
| singlesrecord         = 182–194
| singlestitles         = 1 ITF
| highestsinglesranking = No. 67 (May 8, 1989)
| AustralianOpenresult  = 3R (1992)
| FrenchOpenresult      = 1R (1988, 1989, 1992, 1996)
| Wimbledonresult       = 4R (1988)
| USOpenresult          = 3R (1995)
| doublesrecord         = 419–226
| doublestitles         = 20 WTA, 7 ITF
| highestdoublesranking = No. 8 (August 14, 1989)
| AustralianOpenDoublesresult         = QF (1992)
| FrenchOpenDoublesresult             = QF (1988, 1989, 1992, 1993, 1995, 1996)
| WimbledonDoublesresult              = SF (1988)
| USOpenDoublesresult                 = QF (1991, 1994)
}}

Katrina M. Adams (born August 5, 1968) is an American tennis executive and former professional tennis player from Chicago. She was president and CEO of the United States Tennis Association and chair of the US Open, as well as the chair of the International Tennis Federation Fed Cup and Gender Equality in Tennis committees. As a player, Adams was a doubles specialist, reaching the quarterfinal stage or better at all four Grand Slams as well as achieving a career-high doubles ranking of no. 8 (August 1989). Her book, Own the Arena: Getting Ahead, Making a Difference, and Succeeding as the Only One was published in 2021.

Early life
Adams joined a tennis program on Chicago's West Side when she was six years old. She attended Whitney Young High School, becoming Illinois High School Association the first Chicago Public School and first African American singles champion in 1983 and 1984. While attending Northwestern University, she won the National Collegiate Athletic Association (NCAA) doubles title with Diane Donnelly in 1987, and was twice voted All-American.

Results
Adams won seven of her 20 WTA doubles titles between 1987 and 1996 partnering Zina Garrison, including the 1988 World Doubles Championships.

Her best Grand Slam singles result was in the 1988 Wimbledon Championships when she reached the fourth round, losing to Chris Evert 5–7, 6–3, 6–0. The same year, she was Wimbledon doubles semifinalist with Zina Garrison.

Awards
Adams twice won the annual WTA Player Service Award in 1996 and 1997.

Post-retirement
Adams has been a television commentator for the Tennis Channel since 2003, a regular contributor to CBS Sports Network all-female sports panel We Need to Talk'' and is also an executive director of the Harlem Junior Tennis and Education Program.

In January 2015, Adams became President, Chairman and CEO of the United States Tennis Association, becoming the first former professional tennis player, first African-American and the youngest person to serve as President in the 135-year history of the organisation.

In 2016, Adams became Chairperson of the International Tennis Federation (ITF) Fed Cup committee, which governs the Fed Cup.

Adams also serves on the board of directors for the International Tennis Hall of Fame.

WTA Tour finals

Singles 2 (0–2)

Doubles 36 (22–14)

ITF Finals

Singles (1–1)

Doubles (8–3)

Performance timelines

Singles

Doubles

References

External links
 
 

1968 births
Living people
African-American female tennis players
American female tennis players
Northwestern Wildcats women's tennis players
Sportspeople from Bradenton, Florida
People from White Plains, New York
Tennis people from Florida
Tennis players from Chicago
Tennis people from New York (state)
Whitney M. Young Magnet High School alumni
African-American sports executives and administrators
American sports executives and administrators
African-American tennis coaches
Universiade medalists in tennis
Tennis commentators
Women tennis executives
Universiade bronze medalists for the United States
Medalists at the 1987 Summer Universiade
Medalists at the 1991 Summer Universiade
Medalists at the 1993 Summer Universiade
21st-century African-American people
21st-century African-American women
20th-century African-American sportspeople
20th-century African-American women